Gnorimoschema siskiouense is a moth in the family Gelechiidae. It was described by Povolný in 1985. It is found in North America, where it has been recorded from California, Oregon and Utah.

References

Gnorimoschema
Moths described in 1985